Joanne Missingham (born 26 May 1994) is an Australian-born Taiwanese professional Go player who has participated in international and domestic Go tournaments. She is the first Australian-born player to achieve a professional go ranking. In 2010 she came second in the Qionglongshan Bingsheng Cup and won the 1st Taiwan Wei-ch'i Association Women's Professionals Representative Right Ranking tournament. As of 2016 she has a Go ranking of 7 dan, and is the highest ranked female go player in Taiwan.

Life and career
Missingham was born in 1994 in Brisbane, Australia before moving to Taiwan at the age of four. Her father is Australian, and her mother Hei Nanping was Taiwanese. She died of leukemia in 2014. Missingham studied under professional Go player Zhou Keping and later moved to San Diego in 2005 with her family. In 2010 she became a 1 dan member of the Taiwan Chi Yuan and in the same year was promoted again to 2 dan after coming second in the Bingsheng Cup. Missingham plays professionally under her mother's maiden name and Chinese given name, Hei Jiajia.

Missingham gained media attention in 2011 when she, along with other female players boycotted the Qiandeng Cup after having learned that male players were being paid US$886 per game while female players were not paid at all. In a later tournament she held up a fan with the words in Chinese "protest gender discrimination".

In 2016 she signed a record deal with Taiwanese record company Seed Music to appear in adverts and television productions.

She appeared in My Missing Valentine, an award-winning 2020 Taiwanese romantic comedy film, as a post officer.

Promotion record

References

External links
Hei Jiajia International Ranking
Hei Jiajia's YouTube channel (in Chinese)
Joanne Missingham at Sensei's Library

1994 births
Australian people of Taiwanese descent
Taiwanese people of Australian descent
Taiwanese Go players
Female Go players
Living people
Go players at the 2010 Asian Games
Asian Games medalists in go
Asian Games bronze medalists for Chinese Taipei
Medalists at the 2010 Asian Games